Saint Andrew's chapel is a chapel located in the village of Kos, Slovakia. The building is believed to have been finished in 1409.

History 

The village of Kos was mentioned for the first time in 1367. The new settlement was called Andreasdorf (Andrew's village) probably because of the chapel being consecrated to St. Andrew. In the later epoch, the name of the village was changed to Kos. According to the date inscribed into the central arch, St. Andrew's church was finished in 1409. 

A Gothic chapel was part of the church. The interior of the chapel was painted with unique wall paintings which are now mostly destroyed.

Modern era

In the region of Prievidza, there is a mining industry of lignite and brown coal which influences the environment in the area. The chapel was situated in one of the affected parts of the village and was endangered. That is why the representatives of the regional restoration atelier of the Monumental institute in Banská Bystrica decided to save this historical building. A unique transportation  in Slovak history was planned and the 400 tonne chapel was transported using a wheeled transporter borrowed from Germany on  December 6, 2000. It is now situated in another part of Kos which is not affected by the pollution.

St. Andrew's church panorama 

Chapels in Slovakia